John Timperley may refer to:

John Timperley (civil engineer) (1796–1856), British civil engineer
John Timperley (badminton) (1931–2013), English badminton and squash player
John Timperley (sound engineer) (1941–2006), British audio engineer

See also
Harold John Timperley (1898–1954), Australian journalist